The Boston Tea Party is a 1915 American silent historical film directed by Eugene Nowland. The film is an extended remake of the 1908 film of the same name, also from Edison Studios, and depticts the events of the December 16, 1773, Boston Tea Party.

Plot

Described by Edison as "an adaptation of the memorable historical incident of Colonial times", the plot synopsis was:

Cast
Carlton S. King as Ethan Ward, a colonist
Maxine Brown as Barbara, his sweetheart
Helen Strickland as her mother
Marie La Manna as Lucy, her friend
Bert Delaney as Lieut. Crawford, Lucy's fiancé
Ethel Lawrence as Nancy, the maid
Pat O'Malley as Captain Crewe
Dan Baker as Uncle Abner
Julian Reed as Sam Fleet, a Tory
William Bice as Governor of Massachusetts

References

American silent short films
American black-and-white films
Silent American drama films
1915 drama films
1915 films
Edison Studios films
1910s American films